First Digital TV is a Digital Terrestrial Television Network based in Ghana. It is headquartered in Accra and provides a range of media services.

References

Mass media in Ghana